The men's team time trial event was part of the road cycling programme at the 1976 Summer Olympics. The venue for this event was the Mont-Royal Park, Montreal, Quebec, Canada.

Final standings

References

Road cycling at the 1976 Summer Olympics
Cycling at the Summer Olympics – Men's team time trial